The Qisheng (Traditional: 棋聖; Simplified: 棋圣; Pinyin: Qíshèng) is a Go competition in China organized by the Chinese Weiqi Association. The word qíshèng means "Go saint", similar to the Japanese Kisei and the Korean Kiseong.

Outline
The Qisheng consists of preliminary knockout tournaments to determine the challenger to the previous year's winner, followed by a best-of-three title match. The winner receives 800,000 RMB in prize money, and the runner-up receives 200,000 RMB. Games are played under Chinese rules, with 2 hours of main time and five 60-second byoyomi periods per player.

Past winners and runners-up

References

Qisheng